Biarritz Pays Basque Airport , also known as Biarritz Airport or Biarritz-Parme Airport, is an airport serving Biarritz, French Basque Country. In 2020, the Basque airport was shaken by the global pandemic and saw its infrastructure closed between March and May. A total of 383,366 passengers (down 64.04%) transited through the platform. In 2019, the airport welcomed the aircraft of many delegations during the G7 meeting organized in Biarritz. 
The airport opened on 11 April 1954.

Facilities 
The airport is 245 feet (75 m) above mean sea level. It has one paved runway designated 09/27 which measures 2,250 by 45 metres (7,382 ft × 148 ft).

Airlines and destinations

The following airlines operate regular scheduled and charter flights to and from Biarritz:

Statistics

Passengers

Movements

Ground transport 
The airport is serviced by three bus routes (C, 14, 48), delivering travellers to Biarritz, Bayonne, and Anglet, as well as Bidart and Hendaye. Passengers heading to nearby Spain can take buses operated to Irun, San Sebastian, Pamplona, and Bilbao. Taxis are also accessible at the airport.

References 

External links 

Biarritz – Anglet – Bayonne Airport 
Air Club 
Aéroport de Biarritz-Anglet-Bayonne (Union des Aéroports Français) 

Airports in Nouvelle-Aquitaine
Buildings and structures in Pyrénées-Atlantiques
Biarritz
1954 establishments in France
Airports established in 1954